The orchestral score of Lost is composed, orchestrated, and produced by Michael Giacchino and has been released on a series of soundtrack albums by Varèse Sarabande.

Soundtracks

Season 1 
On March 21, 2006, the original television soundtrack to Lost was released by the record label Varèse Sarabande. It includes full length versions of the themes heard on the show during the first season. The track listing is as follows:

Season 2 
On October 3, 2006, Varèse Sarabande released another soundtrack album featuring music composed by Giacchino from the show's second season. The track listing is as follows:

Season 3 

On May 6, 2008, Varèse Sarabande released another soundtrack album featuring music composed by Giacchino from the show's third season. The soundtrack contains two discs: the first featuring selected music from the season, the second featuring the entire original score from the acclaimed season finale episodes, "Greatest Hits" and "Through the Looking Glass". At 2 hours and 34 minutes, this is the longest soundtrack released from the show.

Disc one

Disc two

Season 4 

Varèse Sarabande released the soundtrack to Season 4 on May 12, 2009. The CD contains over 75 minutes of music.

Season 5 

The soundtrack for Season 5 was released on May 11, 2010, just over a week before the final episode of the series.

Season 6 

The soundtrack for the final season was released on September 14, 2010. It is a two-disc album like the Season 3 soundtrack and features two and a half hours of music. Giacchino had written a number of new themes for season 6 including those for the Man in Black, the Temple, Richard, the Source and the flash-sideways characters. None of the music from the last four episodes of the series is included in this release except for the two bonus tracks from the finale.

Disc one

Disc two

The Last Episodes

Disc one

Disc two

References 

Songs
Television soundtracks
2006 soundtrack albums
2008 soundtrack albums
2009 soundtrack albums
Michael Giacchino soundtracks